Richard Ludvig Philip Weibull Winther (23 July 1926, Maribo, Denmark–30 August 2007, Vindeby, Denmark) was a Danish artist. His career focused mainly on painting, graphics, photography and sculpture. Richard's work was greatly influenced by Asger Jorn and Richard Mortensen, both Danish artists part of the Linien group.

Background

Winther is the youngest of three children born to Carl Christian Winther and Ely Maria Ricardis Weibull. He grew up in a sugar factory. Interested in the arts from an early age, Richard started working on art at age ten and exhibiting his paintings during high school years, after the Linien (The Line) artists' work. Records of his work exist since the early 1940s.

Career
Richard Winther was a student at the Royal Danish Academy of Fine Arts where later he became a professor. He founded the exhibition group Linien II with other young artists which initially focused on a spontaneous-abstract style of painting but with time transformed into a geometric-abstract type of movement. Linien II style falls into the concrete art movement. Later on some of Richard Winther's work became intensely abstract and had some of the characteristics of the De Stijl/Konkret Art characteristics. Richard Winther experimented with lithography in the 1950s. Later, his focus shifted to painting the human body. He was a member of Eks-Skolen founded in 1961 by one of his friends, the artist Poul Gernes. There, he taught several upcoming artists, including Per Kirkeby. While always interested in photography, he dedicated a significant part of the 1960s to this technique, which he would revisit time after time the following decades including his last years.

Richard Winther's work is marked by particular themes such as Jerome (Hieronymus) and the biblical flood. Many of these themes fit the idea of recycled classicism. Between 1994 and 2007 he took the idea of recycling forward, making many of his pieces in cardboard. He took recycling to another level when taking previous artists' lives and works and building further on those personalities. An example of this approach is illustrated by the pieces Winther generated on Wie and Gammel Holtegaard took selected pieces of this effort and exhibited Winther's work on Wie in 2005. Further, Richard Winther took his idea of recycling and applied it to his own work: he revisited many paintings of his as well as his photographic cameras accomplishing an "Rdo Re-do" where Rdo was his latest way of signing his art pieces.

Richard Winther received several awards for his work: the Eckersberg Medal in 1971, Thorvaldsen Medal in 1997, and the Prince Eugen Medal.

Richard Winther was also involved in the movie The Wake directed by Michael Kvium and Christian Lemmerz where he was the character St Patrick.

He was a member of the following groups: Arme og Ben, Decembristerne, Linien II, and Den Frie Udstilling.

There is a permanent collection of his work at the Silkeborg Kunstmuseum in Denmark. The latest solo exhibitions on Richard Winther's works are:

 2001: Stege Bibliotek
 2005: Gammel Holtegaard
 2008–2009: University of Massachusetts Art Gallery
 2010: Museum Jorn
 2011: Clausens Kunsthandel, DAMP and ApArt, Fotografisk Center in Copenhagen, and Møstings Hus
 2012: Rdo Huset and Galleri Tom Christoffersen
 2012–2013: Fuglsang Kunstmuseum
 2013: Galleri Klejn, Rdo Huset, Tal R Galleri, Galleri Tom Christoffersen and Stensalen

Events where Richard Winther and other artists had works exhibited together are:

 2008 Decembristerne
 2010 Lys over Lolland
 2011 Galleri Tom Christoffersen
 2013 Clausens Kunsthandel and Galleri Tom Christoffersen

Books

External links
 Richards Winters Hus

References

1926 births
2007 deaths
People from Lolland Municipality
20th-century Danish painters
21st-century Danish painters
Royal Danish Academy of Fine Arts alumni
Academic staff of the Royal Danish Academy of Fine Arts
Recipients of the Prince Eugen Medal
Recipients of the Thorvaldsen Medal
Recipients of the Eckersberg Medal